The Sam Wanamaker Award or Sam Wanamaker Prize is an award established in 1994 for pioneering work in Shakespearean theatre, usually given to individuals who have worked closely with Shakespeare's Globe or the Royal Shakespeare Company; the award is not specific to artistic contribution, and has frequently been granted to businessmen and academics. It is one of the two current British awards for classical theatre, alongside the Ian Charleson Award. It is presented by  Shakespeare's Globe and named after Sam Wanamaker, the theatre's founder.

Winners
2019 – Diana Devlin
2018 – Thelma Holt
2017 – 25 Globe volunteers
2016 – Gordon McMullan, professor of English at King's College London, founder of "Shakespeare 400" quatercentenary celebrations.
2015 – Christopher Plummer, actor
2014 – Ralph Alan Cohen, co-founder of the American Shakespeare Center
2013 – Michael Sydney Perry, British business executive 
2012 – Gregory Doran, artistic director of Royal Shakespeare Company
2011 – Glynn MacDonald, Resident Master of Movement at Shakespeare's Globe, and Giles Block, Resident Master of Verse and Play at Shakespeare's Globe
2010 – Professor Stanley Wells CBE, Shakespeare scholar and author
2008 – Andrew Gurr, theater historian
2007 – Jenny Tiramani, Claire van Kampen and Mark Rylance
2006 – Dawn Saunders QSM, CEO of the Shakespeare's Globe Centre in New Zealand
2004 – John Orrell, Canadian scholar and theatre historian
2003 – Stephen Unwin and Barrie Rutter, Directors of English Touring Theatre and Northern Broadsides respectively
2002 – Paul Scofield CBE
2001 – John Barton CBE
2000 – Cicely Berry
1999 – Glynne Wickham
1998 – Janet Arnold
1996 – William Hutt
1995 – Leon Garfield
1994 – Dr. Rex Gibson

See also
Ian Charleson Awards
Shakespeare's Globe
Sam Wanamaker

References

External links
Shakespeare's Globe - Sam Wanamaker Award

British theatre awards
Awards established in 1994
William Shakespeare
Awards for classical theatre
Theatrical organisations in the United Kingdom
Theatre in England
British awards
1994 establishments in the United Kingdom